Selby District Council is the local authority for the district of Selby, and is elected every four years.

Political control

Leadership
The leader of the council since 2003 has been:

Council elections
1973 Selby District Council election
1976 Selby District Council election
1979 Selby District Council election (New ward boundaries)
1983 Selby District Council election
1987 Selby District Council election (District boundary changes took place but the number of seats remained the same)
1991 Selby District Council election (District boundary changes took place but the number of seats remained the same)
1995 Selby District Council election (District boundary changes took place but the number of seats remained the same)
1999 Selby District Council election
2003 Selby District Council election (New ward boundaries)
2007 Selby District Council election
2011 Selby District Council election
2015 Selby District Council election (New ward boundaries)
2019 Selby District Council election

By-election results

References

External links
Selby District Council

 
Council elections in North Yorkshire
Selby District
District council elections in England